Anastasiya Andreyevna Komardina (born 8 July 1997) is a Russian tennis player.

Komardina has reached a career-high junior ranking of No. 15, achieved in July 2014.

On 10 April 2017, she reached her best singles ranking of world No. 172. On 11 June 2018, she peaked at No. 89 in the doubles rankings. She has won 12 singles and 22 doubles titles on the ITF Women's Circuit.

Komardina made her main-draw debut on the WTA Tour at the 2015 Hong Kong Tennis Open, where she received entry as lucky loser.

She had her Grand Slam debut at the 2017 Australian Open at the qualifying stage.

Grand Slam singles performance timeline

ITF Circuit finals

Singles: 18 (12 titles, 6 runner-ups)

Doubles: 29 (22 titles, 7 runner-ups)

References

External links
 
 

1997 births
Living people
Russian female tennis players
Tennis players from Moscow
Tennis players at the 2014 Summer Youth Olympics
20th-century Russian women
21st-century Russian women